Bike Week may refer to:
 Daytona Beach Bike Week, an annual motorcycle event and rally in Daytona Beach, Florida
 Laconia Bike Week, an annual motorcycle event and rally in Laconia, New Hampshire
 Bike Week (cycling), an annual international event that advocates bicycling for transportation
 Black Bike Week, an annual African-American motorcycle rally in Myrtle Beach, South Carolina